Ernest T. Kirk  (born April 14, 1952) is an American retired gridiron football player who played in the CFL and NFL for the Edmonton Eskimos and Houston Oilers. He won the Grey Cup with Edmonton in 1975. He played college football at Howard Payne University.

References

1952 births
Living people
Edmonton Elks players